Shangyi Town may refer to these towns in China:

Shangyi, Guangdong, in Zijin County, Guangdong
Shangyi, Sichuan, in Meishan, Sichuan

See also
Shangyi County, Hebei
Shang Yi, Chinese footballer